The Tīmaru River is a river of the Otago region of New Zealand's South Island.

See also
List of rivers of New Zealand

References

Rivers of Otago
Rivers of New Zealand